The First Congregational Church of Riverside is a historic United Church of Christ church at 3504 Mission Inn Avenue in Riverside, California. It was designed by Myron Hunt, and built in 1913. It was added to the National Register in 1997.

It is a two-story Spanish Colonial Revival building with a Latin cross plan with a  Churrigueresque
style corner tower.

visit the home page of the First Congregational Church of Riverside:  http://fccriverside.org

References

Churches in Riverside County, California
Congregational churches in California
National Register of Historic Places in Riverside County, California
Churches on the National Register of Historic Places in California
Churches completed in 1913
1910s architecture in the United States
Myron Hunt buildings
Spanish Colonial Revival architecture in California
1913 establishments in California